Leigh Wilburn is an American lawyer and politician from Tennessee. A Republican, she served in the Tennessee House of Representatives.

Wilburn is from Somerville, Tennessee. She was elected to the Tennessee House in 2014, succeeding Barrett Rich, who retired. She resigned on December 31, 2015, midway through her term, due to what she described as "unforeseen circumstances involving my immediate and extended family and my business." Jamie Jenkins was appointed as her replacement.

References

Living people
Republican Party members of the Tennessee House of Representatives
People from Somerville, Tennessee
Women state legislators in Tennessee
Year of birth missing (living people)
21st-century American women